Australian campaign medals are listed in order of precedence as defined in references below.  Those campaign medals which have been independently issued by Australia to its armed forces are in bold.

Second Boer War 

 Queen's South Africa Medal
 King's South Africa Medal

World War I 

 1914 Star
 1914–15 Star
 British War Medal
 Mercantile Marine War Medal
 Victory Medal
 Naval General Service Medal 1915–62
 General Service Medal 1918–62

World War II 

  1939–45 Star
  Atlantic Star
  Air Crew Europe Star
  Arctic Star
  Africa Star
  Pacific Star
  Burma Star
  Italy Star
  France and Germany Star
  Defence Medal
  War Medal, 1939–45
  Australia Service Medal 1939–45

Post-World War II 
  Australian Active Service Medal 1945–1975
  Korea Medal
  United Nations Service Medal for Korea
  Naval General Service Medal 1915–62
  General Service Medal 1918–62
  General Service Medal 1962
  Vietnam Medal
  Vietnam Logistic and Support Medal
  Australian Active Service Medal
  International Force East Timor Medal (INTERFET)
  Afghanistan Medal
  Iraq Medal
  Australian Service Medal 1945–1975
  Australian General Service Medal for Korea
  Australian Service Medal
  Rhodesia Medal

Australian Operational Service Medal
  Australian Operational Service Medal - Border Protection
  Australian Operational Service Medal - Greater Middle East Operation
  Australian Operational Service Medal - Special Operations
  Australian Operational Service Medal - Counter Terrorism/Special Recovery
  Australian Operational Service Medal - Civilian

Foreign awards
Foreign awards commonly awarded to Australians for campaign service include:

NATO
 NATO Medal with 'ISAF' clasp for service with the International Security Assistance Force.
 NATO Medal with 'Afghanistan clasp for service in Operation Resolute Support.

United Nations
 UN Medal (UNFICYP, Cyprus)
 United Nations Special Service Medal
  UN Medal (UNIIMOG, Iraq)
 UN Medal (UNTAG, Namibia)
 UN Medal (UNTAC, Cambodia)
 UN Medal (UNTSO, Middle East)
 UN Medal (UNAMIR, Rwanda)
 UN Medal (UNOSOM I, UNOSOM II and UNITAF, Somalia)
 UN Medal (UNTAET, UNTAET and UNMISET, East Timor)
 UN Medal (UNMIS, Sudan)
 UN Medal (UNMISS, South Sudan)

20th Century
 Multinational Force and Observers Medal (Multinational Force and Observers)
 Vietnam Campaign Medal (South Vietnam)
 Kuwait Liberation Medal (Saudi Arabia)
 Kuwait Liberation Medal (Kuwait) - Not Authorised for wear on uniform, only as a keepsake.
 Gulf Medal (United Kingdom) awarded for service with British units.
 Pingat Jasa Malaysia (Malaysia)
 Timor Leste Solidarity Medal (East Timor)
 Southwest Asia Service Medal (United States) for service with US units in Operations Desert Shield or Desert Storm.

21st Century
 Iraq Medal (United Kingdom) awarded for service with British units.
 Ebola Medal for Service in West Africa (United Kingdom)

Permission for formal acceptance and wearing of foreign awards is given by the Governor-General on the recommendation of the Prime Minister or the Minister responsible for Australian honours.

See also 

 Australian Honours Order of Precedence
 World War One - Medal Abbreviations
 British campaign medals
 New Zealand campaign medals

Notes

References

Citations

Sources 

 Notes without citations refer to http://www.itsanhonour.gov.au/honours/awards/docs/order_of_wearing.pdf Annex 1 (pp. 6–7)
It's an Honour – Australian government website
Defence Honours & Awards – Australian Defence Force website
Pingat Jasa Malaysia – Defence Honours and Awards

External links 
 Australian Issue of UN Medals

Campaign medals